Morovis is a town and municipality of Puerto Rico located in the central region of the island, north of Orocovis, south of Manatí, Vega Baja and Vega Alta; east of Ciales, and west of Corozal. Morovis is spread over 13 barrios and Morovis Pueblo (the downtown area and the administrative center of the city). It is part of the San Juan-Caguas-Guaynabo Metropolitan Statistical Area.

History
Morovis's local Taino Indian Cacique (Chief) was named Orocobix and his tribe was locally known as the Jatibonicu Taino.

In 1815, a group of residents, under the leadership of Don Juan José de la Torre, began the process to separate Morovis from Manatí. In 1817, the government of Puerto Rico approved the separation, but it was not until 1818 that the requirements of a population of one thousand residents and the construction of a church and several other public buildings was fulfilled, that the municipality of Morovis was officially founded. In 1822, the mayorship was constructed and in 1823, the new church was built, dedicated to Nuestra Señora del Carmen on lands donated by Don Juan Evangelista Rivera. Its first mayor was Don Juan José de la Torre, with its second mayor being Don Juan Evangelista Rivera.
Morovis has a particular nickname. It was the only municipality in Puerto Rico that did not suffer from a cholera epidemic in 1853; as a result, a common phrase, "la isla menos Morovis" ("(all of) the island but Morovis") was coined. The phrase is believed by Puerto Ricans from outside of the town to have a negative connotation against moroveños, while, in reality, it is considered a positive motto.

In 1875, Abino Casellas was mayor of Morovis and in 1879, Cruz Maria Castro was mayor.

Puerto Rico was ceded by Spain in the aftermath of the Spanish–American War under the terms of the Treaty of Paris of 1898 and became a territory of the United States. In 1899, the United States Department of War conducted a census of Puerto Rico finding that the population of Morovis was 11,309.

With a 2016 estimate of 31,603 residents at the time, 1500 to 2000 homes lost their roof and 500 wooden homes were completed destroyed. Roads and bridges were impacted by landslides and flooding, and residents were left without access to electrical power, telecommunication services and basic necessities for many months.

The community in San Lorenzo, a barrio of Morovis with about 1,000 people, was left isolated when the bridge into the barrio was washed away by the Morovis River.

Then mayor of Morovis, Carmen Maldonado delivered food to residents, the municipal town hall became a food distribution center and she arranged for the purchase and delivery of a water truck to provide clean water daily to the residents who did not have access to clean water. 

Maldonado spoke to New York governor Andrew Cuomo, requesting his help and Cuomo responded by contacting H.e.a.r.t. 9/11, a non-profit organization. In early 2019, Maldonado received and thanked volunteers from H.e.a.r.t. 9/11, mostly carpenters who came to Morovis to repair and rebuild homes damaged by the hurricane. In late 2019, H.e.a.r.t. 9/11 was still rebuilding roofs in Morovis.

Geography

Barrios 

Like all municipalities of Puerto Rico, Morovis is subdivided into barrios.

 Barahona
 Cuchillas
 Fránquez
 Monte Llano
 Morovis barrio-pueblo
 Morovis Norte
 Morovis Sud
 Pasto
 Perchas
 Río Grande
 San Lorenzo
 Torrecillas
 Unibón
 Vaga

Sectors

Barrios (which are like minor civil divisions) in turn are further subdivided into smaller local populated place areas/units called sectores (sectors in English). The types of sectores may vary, from normally sector to urbanización to reparto to barriada to residencial, among others.

Special Communities

 (Special Communities of Puerto Rico) are marginalized communities whose citizens are experiencing social exclusion. A map shows these communities occur in nearly every municipality of the commonwealth.

Morovis National (Veterans) Cemetery

The Morovis National Cemetery, a US veterans cemetery, was built in Morovis within a 247.5-acre parcel of land that can be accessed from Highway 137 at Km. 11.2. It was built to replace the existing Puerto Rico National Cemetery located in Bayamón which reached capacity. Construction was underway in 2019 with interments slated to begin in 2021.

Economy
An Energy Consortium was signed in late February, 2019 by the mayors of Villalba, Orocovis, Morovis, Ciales and Barranquitas municipalities. The consortium is the first of its kind for Puerto Rico. It is intended to have those municipalities work together to safeguard and create resilient, and efficient energy networks, with backups for their communities. This is part of the hurricane preparedness plan of these municipalities, which were hit particularly hard by Hurricane Maria on September 20, 2017.

Tourism

Landmarks and places of interest

A well-known landmark in Morovis is The Red Bridge. It's an iron bridge which was built in 1912 and is located on PR-155 in barrio Morovis Norte.
Cuevas Las Cabachuelas (Cabachuelas Caves) is a cave system in Puerto Rico which opened for tourism in 2019. It is located between the municipalities of Morovis and Ciales, Puerto Rico in the Cabachuelas Natural Reserve, established in 2012 and is of cultural, archaeological, hydrological and geomorphological importance to Puerto Rico. Guided tours are offered by the Diógenes Colón Gómez Cultural Center in Morovis, by reservation only.

The bread has a curious name and look, resembling crossed legs.

The Julia M. Cheverez Electronic Library is located in the main square in Morovis barrio-pueblo also referred to as the pueblo.

Each barrio had a mural painted by a group of local artists and ValorArte and the mural images depict values such as honor, peace, responsibility, leadership and culture.

Culture

Festivals and events
Morovis celebrates its patron saint festival in July. The  in honor of Our Lady of Mount Carmel is a religious and cultural celebration that generally features parades, games, artisans, amusement rides, regional food, and live entertainment.

Other festivals and events include:
Tribute to Don Felo - May
 - June
Cuatro Festival - July
The Island Except Morovis - December
Innocents' Day - December

Demographics

Government

Carmen Maldonado González, has been the elected  mayor of Morovis since 2017 and managed the devastation in Morovis caused by Hurricane Maria on September 20, 2017. The bridge collapse in Morovis' San Lorenzo barrio was one of the challenges faced by Maldonado. Maldonado was reelected in 2020.

Transportation

There are 15 bridges in Morovis. Major routes that go through Morovis include PR-137, PR-145, PR-155, PR-159, and PR-160.

Symbols
The  has an official flag and coat of arms.

Flag
The flag of Morovis is divided vertically in two equal parts. The immediate one to the mast is yellow and has the eagle of the coat of arms, in this case with the head facing left, toward the flagpole. The other half is divided in seven vertical stripes of equal width, four red ones alternated with three yellow ones.

Coat of arms
The coat of arms of the Municipality of Morovis is formed by an eagle in the left partition, which symbolizes Saint John the Evangelist and sings in honor of the founder of the town, Don Juan Evangelista Rivera. The five cuatros observable in the right partition symbolize the fact that the town of Morovis is the main center of production of such typical Puerto Rican musical instruments. The shield in the center represents the Order of the Carmelite Nuns, and symbolizes as well the Our Lady of the Carmen, matron of the town. The left half is a field of yellow color (yellow for gold) in which resides a saber (black) eagle, beak and claws in red, its head enclosed with a halo.

Notable moroveños
 Wesley Correa, basketball player, played for the local team 16 years
 Iluminado Davila Medina, cuatro musician
 Julio Negrón Rivera, master craftsman who makes the Puerto Rican cuatro, a musical instrument of Puerto Rico

Gallery

See also

List of Puerto Ricans
History of Puerto Rico
Did you know-Puerto Rico?

References

Further reading

External links 
 Puerto Rico Government Directory - Morovis
 Morovis Municipality on Facebook

 
Municipalities of Puerto Rico
Populated places established in 1815
San Juan–Caguas–Guaynabo metropolitan area
1815 establishments in Puerto Rico
Energy in Puerto Rico